Brieux is a commune in the Orne department in northwestern France. The town gave its name to the ancestors of Robert the Bruce, Bruce being the Anglicisation of "Brieux".

Population

See also
Communes of the Orne department

References

Communes of Orne